The Hobart trolleybus system operated in Hobart, Tasmania, Australia from 1935 until 1968.

History
The Hobart trolleybus system opened on 29 October 1935 when a route from the Hobart City Centre to South Hobart commenced replacing a tram. Starting at Hobart Town Hall in Argyle Street it travelled along Macquarie Street, Davey Street and Huon Road terminating at the intersection with Congress Street.

On 14 October 1937, a second route began running to New Town station and in mid-1939 was extended to Cornelian Bay. A further service to Cascades commenced on 24 August 1942, being extended along Strickland Avenue on 11 October 1948. Further lines opened to Dynnyrne on 4 June 1945 and Sandy Bay on 7 December 1952.

On 1 March 1955, operation of the network passed from the Hobart City Council to the Metropolitan Transport Trust. A final line opened to West Hobart on 23 February 1958. At this stage the network, extended for 22 kilometres. In February 1967, much of the Strickland Avenue route infrastructure and one bus was destroyed by fire.

The Cornelian Bay line closed in 1959 with the rest of the network closing in stages in 1968.

Services
Hobart's trolleybus routes were as follows:

Fleet
Operations commenced with a single Leyland TTB bodied by Hobart Municipal Tramways. A further four were acquired in 1937. Between 1939 and 1946, 22 Leyland TB5s were purchased. Between 1950 and 1952, 36 BUT ETB/1s bodied by City Body Works were delivered with the five Leyland TTBs withdrawn in 1953. In 1964, five second-hand BUT RETB/1s were purchased from Launceston.

BUT ETB/1 no. 235 has been preserved by the Tasmanian Transport Museum.

Depot
Initially housed at the city tram depot on the corner of Macquarie and Campbell Streets, in 1944 a trolleybuses depot opened on Collins Street. On 29 October 1954, a new depot opened on Davey Street.

References

External links

Hobart
Transport in Hobart
Hobart
1935 establishments in Australia
1968 disestablishments in Australia